John Brock may refer to:
John Brock (baseball) (1896–1951), American Major League Baseball catcher 
John Brock (footballer) (1915–1976), English football goalkeeper
John F. Brock (born 1948), American businessman and CEO of Coca-Cola
John W. Brock (1914–1942), United States Navy pilot
John Brock, fictional character by Desmond Skirrow

See also
Brock (surname)